Al-Sailiya Sports Club is a Qatari professional football club currently competing in the Qatar Stars League. They are based in Doha and play their home games at Hamad bin Khalifa Stadium.

History
Al Sailiya were founded as Al Qadsiya on 10 October 1995. In 2003, the club adopted its current name, Al Sailiya.

They were relegated in 2006 after finishing at the bottom of the Qatar Stars League. They won promotion back to the Qatar Stars League for the 2007–08 season, but were once again relegated to the Qatargas League in the 2010–11 season. They won promotion again, but finished last in the Stars League that year. However, a decision to expand the QSL to 14 teams ensured Sailiya's place in the top flight was secure.

Timeline
Last update: 6 January 2014.

Statistics

Stadium
Built in 1995, the Al-Sailiya Stadium covers 60,000 m² and features a football pitches with a capacity for 1,500 people, two training pitches, locker rooms, an administrative office and other administrative buildings. However, due to its insufficient capacity and facilities, the club frequently uses Hamad bin Khalifa Stadium as its homegrounds.

Players
As of Qatar Stars League:

Out on loan

Notable players

This list includes players whom have made significant contributions to their national team and to the club. At least 100 caps for the club or 80 caps for their national team is needed to be considered for inclusion.

Personnel

Current technical staff
Last update: 20 December 2014.

Managerial history
As of 6 June 2012.

Honours
Qatari Stars Cup
 Winners (2): 2020–21, 2021–22

Qatar FA Cup
 winners (1): 2021

Qatari Second Division
 Winners (4): 2002–03, 2004–05, 2006–07, 2011–12

Qatar Second Division Cup
 Winners (3): 1998, 2005, 2011

Continental record

References

External links
Official website

 
Sailiya
Sailiya
Association football clubs established in 1995
1995 establishments in Qatar